Bidirectional associative memory (BAM) is a type of recurrent neural network. BAM was introduced by Bart Kosko in 1988. There are two types of associative memory, auto-associative and hetero-associative. BAM is hetero-associative, meaning given a pattern it can return another pattern which is potentially of a different size.  It is similar to the Hopfield network in that they are both forms of associative memory. However, Hopfield nets return patterns of the same size. 

It is said to be bi-directional as it can respond to inputs from either the input or the output layer.

Topology 
A BAM contains two layers of neurons, which we shall denote X and Y. Layers X and Y are fully connected to each other. Once the weights have been established, input into layer X presents the pattern in layer Y, and vice versa.

Thus, the weight matrix is calculated in both directions.

Procedure

Learning
Imagine we wish to store two associations, A1:B1 and A2:B2.
 A1 = (1, 0, 1, 0, 1, 0), B1 = (1, 1, 0, 0)
 A2 = (1, 1, 1, 0, 0, 0), B2 = (1, 0, 1, 0)

These are then transformed into the bipolar forms:
 X1 = (1, -1, 1, -1, 1, -1), Y1 = (1, 1, -1, -1)
 X2 = (1, 1, 1, -1, -1, -1), Y2 = (1, -1, 1, -1)

From there, we calculate  where  denotes the transpose.
So,

Recall
To retrieve the association A1, we multiply it by M to get (4, 2, -2, -4), which, when run through a threshold, yields (1, 1, 0, 0), which is B1.
To find the reverse association, multiply this by the transpose of M.

Capacity

The internal matrix has n x p independent degrees of freedom, where n is the dimension of the first vector (6 in this example) and p is the dimension of the second vector (4).  This allows the BAM to be able to reliably store and recall a total of up to min(n,p) independent vector pairs, or min(6,4) = 4 in this example. The capacity can be increased above by sacrificing reliability (incorrect bits on the output).

Stability 
A pair  defines the state of a BAM. To store a pattern, the energy function value for that pattern has to occupy a minimum point in the energy landscape. 

The stability analysis of a BAM is based on the definition of Lyapunov function (energy function)  , with each state . When a paired pattern  is presented to BAM, the neurons change states until a bi-directionally stable state  is reached, which Kosko proved to correspond to a local minimum of the energy function. The discrete BAM is proved to converge to a stable state. 

(i.e. ).

See also
 Autoassociative memory
 Self-organizing feature map

References

External links 
 Bidirectional Associative Memory – Python source code for the Wiki article
 Bidirectional associative memories – ACM Portal Reference

Artificial neural networks